Somoplatus is a genus of ground beetles in the family Carabidae. There are about 15 described species in Somoplatus, found in Africa and Europe.

Species
These 15 species belong to the genus Somoplatus:

 Somoplatus amplicollis Basilewsky, 1986  (West Africa)
 Somoplatus brevicollis (Dejean, 1831)  (West Africa)
 Somoplatus depilis Schüle, 2009  (Ivory Coast)
 Somoplatus elongatus Burgeon, 1936  (West Africa)
 Somoplatus fulvus Mulsant & Godart, 1867  (Europe, Africa)
 Somoplatus genierorum Schüle, 2009  (Burkina Faso)
 Somoplatus girardi Basilewsky, 1986  (West Africa)
 Somoplatus guineensis Basilewsky, 1986  (Guinea)
 Somoplatus hospes Andrewes, 1933  (India)
 Somoplatus ivoirensis Schüle, 2009  (Ivory Coast)
 Somoplatus morettoi Schüle, 2009  (Ivory Coast)
 Somoplatus pilicollis Schüle, 2009  (West Africa)
 Somoplatus septentrionalis Burgeon, 1936  (Sub-Saharan Africa)
 Somoplatus simillimus Basilewsky, 1986  (Sub-Saharan Africa)
 Somoplatus substriatus Dejean, 1829  (Europe, Africa)

References

Lebiinae
Beetle genera